Pastan is a surname. Notable people with the surname include:

 Ira Pastan (born 1931), American scientist
 Linda Pastan (1932–2023), American poet